"Tu Cuerpo" (English: "Your Body") is a song by American rapper Pitbull, released on February 15, 2011, as the fourth official single from his fifth studio album, Armando (2010). It features vocals from American singer Jencarlos. It combines hip hop and "Latin Pop-style theatricality".

Music video
The music video was released onto Pitbull's official VEVO channel on March 10, 2011. It features Pitbull, Jencarlos and a girl that dances.

The video has received over 33 million views.

Background and composition 
Following "Bon, Bon", "Tu Cuerpo" is the fourth single from Pitbull's fifth studio album Armando, but this song released after first single on sixth studio album Planet Pit on February 15, 2011.

Track listing 
Digital download
 "Tu Cuerpo" (featuring Jencarlos) – 4:04

Credits and personnel 
Adapted from the album credits.

 Armando C. Perez – songwriter
 Jencarlos Canela – songwriter, producer
 David "D-Minor" Miranda – producer

Chart performance

Release history

References 

2010 songs
Pitbull (rapper) songs
Spanish-language songs
2011 singles
Songs written by Pitbull (rapper)
Sony Music Latin singles
Songs written by Jencarlos Canela